Gerardus Peter Jan (Ger) Koopmans (born 14 August 1962 in Velden) is a former Dutch politician. As a member of the Christian Democratic Appeal (Christen-Democratisch Appèl) he was an MP from 23 May 2002 to 19 September 2012. He focused on matters of agriculture, conservation, food safety and governmental organization.

He was chairman of the National Board of Scouting Nederland from 2006 until 2011.

Decorations 
 In 2012 he was awarded Knight of the Order of Orange-Nassau.

References 
  Parlement.com biography

1962 births
Living people
Aldermen in Limburg (Netherlands)
Christian Democratic Appeal politicians
Gay politicians
Knights of the Order of Orange-Nassau
LGBT conservatism
LGBT members of the Parliament of the Netherlands
LGBT mayors of places in the Netherlands
Members of the House of Representatives (Netherlands)
Mayors in Limburg (Netherlands)
Municipal councillors in Limburg (Netherlands)
People from Arcen en Velden
Scouting and Guiding in the Netherlands
21st-century Dutch politicians